Ahmed Sékou Touré (var. Sheku Turay or Ture;; January 9, 1922 – March 26, 1984) was a Guinean political leader and African statesman who became the first president of Guinea, serving from 1958 until his death in 1984. Touré was among the primary Guinean nationalists involved in gaining independence of the country from France.

A devout Muslim from the Mandinka ethnic group, Sékou Touré was the great grandson of the powerful Mandinka Muslim cleric Samori Ture who established an independent Islamic rule in part of West Africa. In 1960, he declared his Democratic Party of Guinea (Parti démocratique de Guinée, PDG) the only legal party in the state, and ruled from then on as a virtual dictator. He was re-elected unopposed to four seven-year terms in the absence of any legal opposition. Under his rule many people were killed, including at the notorious Camp Boiro.

Early career

Sékou Touré was born on January 9, 1922, into a Muslim family in Faranah, French Guinea, a colony of France. Faranah is a town deep inside Guinea situated on the banks of the Niger River. He was one of seven children born to Alpha Touré and Aminata Touré, who were subsistence farmers. He was an aristocratic member of the Mandinka ethnic group. His great-grandfather was Samori Ture (Samory Touré), a noted Muslim Mandinka king who founded the Wassoulou Empire (1861–1890) in the territory of Guinea and Mali, defeating numerous small African states with his large, professionally organized and equipped army. He resisted French colonial rule until his capture in 1898, and died while held in exile in Gabon.

Sékou Touré attended the École Coranique (Qur'anic school) in his hometown and later a French lower-primary school in Kankan. He was enrolled in the Georges Poiret Technical College in Conakry in 1936 but was expelled less than a year later at the age of 15 for leading a student protest against the quality of food and quickly became involved in labor union activity. During his youth, Touré studied the works of Karl Marx and Vladimir Lenin, among others.

In 1940, Touré obtained a clerk's position with the Compagnie du Niger Français while also working to complete an examination course, which would allow him to join the Post, Telegraph and Telecommunications services (French: Postes, télégraphes et téléphones (PTT)). After completing the examination course, he went on to work for the PTT as a postal clerk in Conakry in 1941. During this time, he formed connections with the French General Confederation of Labour, a communist-dominated French labor organization.

Politics and trade unions
Touré first became politically active while working for the PTT. In 1945, he founded the Post and Telecommunications Workers' Union (SPTT; the first trade union in French Guinea), and he became the general secretary of the union in 1946. Also the same year, he was a founding member of the African Democratic Rally (French: Rassemblement Démocratique Africain, RDA), an alliance of political parties and affiliates in French West and Equatorial Africa.

By 1948, he was elected general secretary of the Territorial Union of the Confédération Générale du Travail (CGT), and two years later, he was named general secretary of the coordinating committee of the (CGT) for French West Africa and French Togoland.

In 1952, he became the leader of the Democratic Party of Guinea (Parti démocratique de Guinée, PDG), the RDA's Guinean section. The RDA agitated for the decolonization of Africa, and included representatives from all the French West African colonies. The party forged alliance with labor unions and Touré was elected as secretary-general.

His greatest success as a trade union leader was when workers across French Guinea went on a 71-day general strike (longer than any other territories in the French West Africa) in 1953 to force the implementation of a new overseas labor code. He was later elected to Guinea's Territorial Assembly the same year. As a result, he was elected as one of the three secretaries-general of the French Communist Party's Confédération Générale du Travail (General Confederation of Labour; CGT) in 1954.

In 1957, he organized the Union Générale des Travailleurs d'Afrique Noire, a common trade union centre for French West Africa. He was a leader of the RDA, working closely with Félix Houphouët-Boigny, who later was elected as president of the Ivory Coast. In 1956, Touré was elected Guinea's deputy to the French National Assembly and mayor of Conakry, positions he used to criticize the French colonial regime.

Touré served for some time as a representative of African groups in France, where he worked to negotiate for the independence of France's African colonies.

In September 1958, Guinea participated in the referendum on the new Constitution of France. On acceptance of the new constitution, French overseas territories had the option of choosing to continue their existing status, to move toward full integration into metropolitan France, or to acquire the status of an autonomous republic in the new quasi-federal French Community. If, however, they rejected the new constitution, they would become independent forthwith. French President Charles de Gaulle made it clear that a country pursuing the independent course would no longer receive French economic and financial aid or retain French technical and administrative officers.

In 1958, Touré's PDG, pushed for a "No" in the French Union referendum sponsored by the French government. Upon hearing of Touré's choice on the matter, General de Gaulle responded, "Then all you have to do is vote 'no'. I pledge myself that nobody will stand in the way of your independence." The French also threatened to cut off all their aid to Guinea in the event that the colony voted to become independent of France. The electorate of Guinea rejected the new constitution overwhelmingly, and Guinea accordingly became an independent state on 2 October 1958, with Touré, leader of Guinea's strongest labor union, as president. Guinea was thus the only African colony to vote for immediate independence rather than continued association with France, and hence was the only French colony to decline participation in the new French Community when it became independent in 1958. In any event, the rest of Francophone Africa gained effective independence two years later in 1960.

In response to the vote for immediate and total independence, the vindictive French settlers and colonialists in Guinea were quite dramatic in severing ties with Guinea, with many French civil servants destroying Guinean infrastructure as they departed Guinea as an act of vengeance for Guineans voting to become independent. The Washington Post observed how brutal the French were in tearing down all what they thought was their contributions to Guinea: "In reaction, and as a warning to other French-speaking territories, the French pulled out of Guinea over a two-month period, taking everything they could with them. They unscrewed light bulbs, removed plans for sewage pipelines in Conakry, the capital, and even burned medicines rather than leave them for the Guineans."

President of Guinea

In 1960, Touré declared the PDG to be the only legal party, though the country had effectively been a one-party state since independence. For the next 24 years, Touré effectively held all governing power in the nation. He was elected to a seven-year term as president in 1961; as leader of the PDG he was the only candidate. He was reelected unopposed in 1968, 1974 and 1982. Every five years, a single list of PDG candidates was returned to the National Assembly.

During his presidency, Touré's policies were strongly based on socialism, with the nationalization of foreign companies and centralized economic plans. He won the Lenin Peace Prize as a result in 1961. His early actions to reject the French and then to appropriate wealth and farmland from traditional landlords angered many powerful forces, but the increasing failure of his government to provide either economic opportunities or democratic rights angered more. Famously, he stated that "Guinea prefers poverty in freedom to riches in slavery."

Guineans who had fled reported that Touré's regime "practices tyranny and torture on a daily basis".  His approach towards his opponents caused charges to be brought from Amnesty International (as well as other human rights organizations), accusing his rule to be too oppressive. From 1965 to 1975 Touré ended all his government's relations with France, the former colonial power.

Touré argued that Africa had lost much during colonization, and that Africa ought to retaliate by cutting off ties to former colonial nations. However, in 1978 Guinea's ties with the Soviet Union soured, and, as a sign of reconciliation, President of France Valéry Giscard d'Estaing visited Guinea, the first state visit by a French president.

Throughout Touré's dispute with France, he maintained good relations with several socialist countries. However, Touré's attitude toward France was not generally well received by his own people and some other African countries ended diplomatic relations with Guinea over his actions. He also often voiced his distrust of other African nations.  Meanwhile, some 1.5 million Guineans were fleeing Guinea to neighboring countries, such as Sierra Leone. Despite this, Touré's position won the support of many anti-colonialist and Pan-African groups and leaders.

Touré's primary allies in the region were presidents Kwame Nkrumah of Ghana and Modibo Keita of Mali. After Nkrumah was overthrown in a 1966 coup, Touré offered him asylum in Guinea and gave him the honorary title of co-president. As a leader of the Pan-Africanist movement, Touré consistently spoke out against colonial powers, and befriended African American civil rights activists such as Malcolm X and Stokely Carmichael, to whom he offered asylum. Carmichael took the two leaders' names, as Kwame Ture.

With Nkrumah, Touré helped in the formation of the All-African Peoples Revolutionary Party, and aided the PAIGC guerrillas in their fight against Portuguese colonialism in neighboring Portuguese Guinea. The Portuguese launched an attack upon Conakry in 1970 in order to rescue Portuguese prisoners of war, overthrow Touré's regime, and destroy PAIGC bases. They succeeded in the rescue but failed to dislodge Touré's regime.

His relations with Washington soured, however, after Kennedy's death. When a Guinean delegation was imprisoned in Ghana, after the overthrow of Nkrumah, Touré blamed Washington. He feared that the Central Intelligence Agency, as well as the Soviet Union, were plotting against his own regime even though he was taking economic aid from both parties.

During its first three decades of independence, Guinea developed into a militantly socialist state, which merged the functions and membership of the PDG with the various institutions of government, including the public state bureaucracy. This unified party-state had nearly complete control over the country's economic and political life. Guinea expelled the US Peace Corps in 1966 because of their alleged involvement in a plot to overthrow President Touré. Similar charges were directed against France; diplomatic relations were severed in 1965 and Touré did not renew them until 1975. An ongoing source of contention between Guinea and its French-speaking neighbors was the estimated half-million expatriates in Senegal and Ivory Coast; some were active dissidents who, in 1966, formed the National Liberation Front of Guinea (Front de Libération Nationale de Guinée, or FLNG).

International tensions erupted again in 1970 when some 350 men, under the leadership of Portuguese officers from Portuguese Guinea (now Guinea-Bissau), including FLNG partisans and African Portuguese soldiers, entered Guinea in order to rescue Portuguese prisoners detained in Conakry and capture Touré. Touré directed waves of arrests, detentions, and some executions of known and suspected opposition leaders in Guinea followed this military operation.

In Le Français est à nous! (French language belongs to us!), french university teachers Maria Candéa an Laélia Véron praise Touré for having made official eight local languages of Guinea. They describe his linguistic policy as "très ambitieuse (very ambitous)".

Between 1969 and 1976, according to Amnesty International, 4,000 persons in Guinea were detained for political reasons, with the fate of 2,900 unknown. After an alleged Fulani plot to assassinate Touré was disclosed in May 1976, Diallo Telli, a cabinet minister and formerly the first secretary-general of the OAU, was arrested and sent to prison. He died without trial in November of that year.

In 1977, protests against the regime's economic policy, which dealt harshly with unauthorized trading, led to riots in which three regional governors were killed. Touré responded by relaxing restrictions on trading, offering amnesty to exiles (thousands of whom returned), and releasing hundreds of political prisoners. Relations with the Soviet bloc grew cooler, as Touré sought to increase Western aid and private investment for Guinea's sagging economy.

He imprisoned or exiled his strongest opposition leaders. It is estimated that 50,000 people were killed under his regime. Over time, Touré arrested large numbers of suspected political opponents and imprisoned them in concentration camps, such as the notorious Camp Boiro. As a result of mass graves found in 2002, some 50,000 people are believed to have been killed under the regime of Touré.

Domestically, Sékou Touré pursued socialist economic policies, including nationalizations of banks, energy and transportation; in foreign affairs, he joined the Non-Aligned Movement and developed very close relations with Mao Zedong and the People's Republic of China.

Once Guinea began its rapprochement with France in the late 1970s, Marxists among Touré's supporters began to oppose his government's shift toward capitalist liberalisation. In 1978, Touré formally renounced Marxism and reestablished trade with the West.

Single-list elections for an expanded National Assembly were held in 1980. Touré was elected unopposed to a fourth seven-year term as president on 9 May 1982. A new constitution was adopted that month, and during the summer Touré visited the United States. While in Washington, Touré urged for more American private investment in Guinea, and claimed that the country had "fabulous economic potential" due to its mineral reserves.  This was taken by US diplomats to be a confession of the failure of Marxism. It was part of his economic policy change that led him to seek Western investment in order to develop Guinea's huge mineral reserves. At the same time, however, the annual average income of Guineans was US$140, life expectancy was only at 41 years, and the literacy rate was only 10%. Measures announced in 1983 brought further economic liberalization, including the delegation of produce marketing to private traders.

Death

Touré died of an apparent heart attack on 26 March 1984 while undergoing cardiac treatment at the Cleveland Clinic in Cleveland, Ohio, for emergency heart surgery; he had been rushed to the United States after being stricken in Saudi Arabia the previous day. Touré's tomb is at the Camayanne Mausoleum, situated within the gardens of the Conakry Grand Mosque.

Prime Minister Louis Lansana Béavogui became acting president, pending elections that were to be held within 45 days. The Political Bureau of the ruling Guinea Democratic Party was due to name its choice as Touré's successor on 3 April 1984. Under the constitution, the PDG's new leader would have been automatically elected to a seven-year term as president and confirmed in office by the voters by the end of spring. Just hours before that meeting took place, the military seized power in a coup d'état. They denounced the last years of Touré's rule as a "bloody and ruthless dictatorship." The constitution was suspended, the National Assembly dissolved, and the PDG abolished. Colonel Lansana Conté, leader of the coup, assumed the presidency on 5 April, heading the Military Committee of National Restoration (Comité Militaire de Redressement National—CMRN). The military group freed about 1,000 political prisoners.

In 1985 Conté took advantage of an alleged coup attempt to arrest and execute several of Sékou Touré's close associates, including Ismael Touré, Mamadi Keïta, Siaka Touré, former commander of Camp Boiro; and Moussa Diakité.

Desecration of Touré's tomb 
On July 14, 2020, his grave was desecrated by an unknown person. According to a relative of the CEO of the GDR who went to the scene of the desecration, the individual set fire to the tricolor which was in the grave. Then he began to pour liquid into the burial place of the first historical leader of the country. The next day his widow lamented the act of desecration. She herself clarified that the mausoleum belongs to her clan and that it is abandoned without security, she considered hiring security personnel.

Foreign awards and honours
 
  Collar of the Order of the White Lion (1959)
 
  Grand Cross of the Legion of Honour
 
  Supreme Commander of the Order of the Companions of O. R. Tambo (2004)
 
  Lenin Peace Prize (1961)
 
  Collar of the Order of Civil Merit (1979)
 
  Grand Cross of the Order of Merit of the Federal Republic of Germany (1959)

Works by Touré (partial)
 Ahmed Sékou Touré. 8 novembre 1964 (Conakry) : Parti démocratique de Guinée, (1965)
 A propos du Sahara Occidental : intervention du président Ahmed Sékou Touré devant le 17e sommet de l'OUA, Freetown, le 3 juillet 1980. (S.l. : s.n., 1980)
 Address of President Ahmed Sékou Touré, President of the Republic of Guinee (sic) : suggestions submitted during the West Africa consultative regional meeting held at Conakry, during 19 and 20 November 1971. (Cairo : Permanent Secretariat of the Afro-Asian Peoples' Solidarity Organization, 1971)
 Afrika and imperialism. Newark, N.J. : Jihad Pub. Co., 1973.
 Conférences, discours et rapports, Conakry : Impr. du Gouvernement, (1958–)
 Congres général de l'U.G.T.A.N. (Union général des travailleurs de l'Afrique noire) : Conakry, 15–18 janvier 1959 : rapport d'orientation et de doctrine. (Paris) : Présence africaine, c1959.
 Discours de Monsieur Sékou Touré, Président du Conseil de Gouvernement des 28 juillet et 25 aout 1958, de Monsieur Diallo Saifoulaye, Président de l'Assemblée territoriale et du Général de Gaulle, Président du Gouvernement de la Républ (Conakry) : Guinée Française, (1958)
 Doctrine and methods of the Democratic Party of Guinea (Conakry 1963).
 Expérience guinéenne et unité africaine. Paris, Présence africaine (1959)
 Guinée-Festival / commentaire et montage, Wolibo Dukuré dit Grand-pére. Conakry : Commission Culturelle du Comité Central, 1983.
 Guinée, prélude à l'indépendance (Avant-propos de Jacques Rabemananjara) Paris, Présence africaine (1958)
 Hommage à la révolution Cubaine ; Message du camarade Ahmed Sekou Toure au peuple Cubain à l'occasion du 20e anniversaire de l'attaque de la Caserne de Moncada (Juillet 1973). Conakry : Bureau de Presse de la Presidence de la Republique, (1975).
 Ahmed Sékou Touré. International policy and diplomatic action of the Democratic Party of Guinea; extracts from the report on doctrine and orientation submitted to the 3d National Conference of the P.D.G. (Cairo, Société Orientale de Publicité-Press, 1962)
 Ahmed Sékou Touré. Opening speech of the Summit of Heads of State and Government by President Ahmed Sékou Touré, chairman of the Summit (November 20, 1980). (S.l. : s.n., 1980)
 Ahmed Sékou Touré. Poèmes militants. (Conakry, Guinea) : Parti démocratique de Guinée, 1964
 Ahmed Sékou Touré. Political leader considered as the representative of a culture. (Newark, N. J. : Jihad Productions, 19--)
 Ahmed Sékou Touré. Pour l'amitié algéro-guinéenne. (Conakry, Guinea : Parti démocratique de Guinée, 1972)
 Rapport de doctrine et de politique générale, Conakry : Imprimerie Nationale, 1959.
 Strategy and tactics of the revolution, Conakry, Guinea : Press Office, 1978.
 Unité nationale, Conakry, République de Guinée (B.P. 1005, Conakry, République de Guinée) : Bureau de presse de la Présidence de la République, 1977.

See also

 Politics of Guinea
 1963 visit by Sékou Touré to the Republic of the Congo
 Palais présidentiel Sekhoutoureah

References

Citations

Sources 

 Henry Louis Gates, Anthony Appiah (eds). Africana: The Encyclopedia of the African and African, "Ahmed Sékou Touré," pp. 1857–58. Basic Civitas Books (1999). 
 
 Molefi K. Asante, Ama Mazama. Encyclopedia of Black Studies. Sage Publications (2005) 
  Ibrahima Baba Kake. Sékou Touré. Le Héros et le Tyran. Paris, 1987, JA Presses. Collection Jeune Afrique Livres. 254 p
 Lansiné Kaba. "From Colonialism to Autocracy: Guinea under Sékou Touré, 1957–1984;" in Decolonization and African Independence, the Transfers of Power, 1960–1980. Prosser Gifford and William Roger Louis (eds). New Haven: Yale University Press, 1988.
 Phineas Malinga. "Ahmed Sékou Touré: An African Tragedy" 
 Baruch Hirson. "The Misdirection of C.L.R. James", Communalism and Socialism in Africa, 1989.
 John Leslie. Towards an African socialism, International Socialism (1st series), No.1, Spring 1960, pp. 15–19.
  Alpha Mohamed Sow, "Conflits ethnique dans un État révolutionnaire (Le cas Guinéen)", in Les ethnies ont une histoire, Jean-Pierre Chrétien, Gérard Prunier (ed), pp. 386–405, Karthala Editions (2003) 
 Parts of this article were translated from French Wikipedia's :fr:Ahmed Sékou Touré.

 News articles

 "New West Africa Union Sealed By Heads of Ghana and Guinea" By Thomas F. Brady, The New York Times. May 2, 1959, p. 2
 Guinea Shuns Tie to World Blocs; But New State Gets Most Aid From East—Toure Departs for a Visit to the U. S. By John B. Oakes, The New York Times, October 25, 1959, p. 16,
 Red Aid to Guinea Rises By Homer Bigart, The New York Times. March 6, 1960, p. 4
 Henry Tanner. Regime in Guinea Seizes 2 Utilities; Toure Nationalizes Power and Water Supply Concerns—Pledges Compensation, The New York Times. February 2, 1961, Thursday, p. 3
 Toure Says Reds Plotted a Coup; Links Communists to Riots by Students Last Month. (UPI), The New York Times. December 13, 1961, Wednesday, p. 14
 Toure's Country--'Africa Incarnate'; Gui'nea embodies the emphatic nationalism and revolutionary hopes of ex-colonial Africa, but its energetic President confronts handicaps that are also typically African. Toure's Country--'Africa Incarnate' By David Halberstam, July 8, 1962, Sunday The New York Times Magazine, p. 146
 Guinea Relaxes Business Curbs; Turns to Free Enterprise to Rescue Economy. (Reuters), The New York Times, December 8, 1963, Sunday p. 24
 U.S. Peace Corps Ousted by Guinea; 72 Members and Dependents to Leave Within a Week By Richard Eder, The New York Times, November 9, 1966, Wednesday, p. 11
 Guinea Is Warming West African Ties, The New York Times, January 26, 1968, Friday, p. 52
 Alfred Friendly Jr. Toure Adopting a Moderate Tone; But West Africa Is Skeptical of Guinean's Words. The New York Times. April 28, 1968, Sunday, p. 13
 Ebb of African 'Revolution', The New York Times, December 7, 1968, Saturday p. 46
 Guinea's President Charges A Plot to Overthrow Him, (Agence France-Presse), The New York Times, January 16, 1969, Thursday p. 10
 Guinea Reports 2 Members Of Cabinet Seized in Plot, (Reuters), The New York Times, March 22, 1969, Saturday p. 14
 12 Foes of Regime Doomed in Guinea, The New York Times, May 16, 1969, Friday p. 2
 Guinea Reports Invasion From Sea by Portuguese; Lisbon Denies Charge U.N. Council Calls for End to Attack Guinea Reports an Invasion From Sea (Associated Press), The New York Times, November 23, 1970, Monday, p. 1
 Guinea: Attack Strengthens Country's Symbolic Role, The New York Times, November 29, 1970, Sunday, p. 194
 Guinean is Adamant On Death Sentences, The New York Times, January 29, 1971, Friday. p. 3
 Guinea Wooing the West In Bauxite Development; Guinea is Seeking Help On Bauxite, The New York Times, February 15, 1971, Monday Section: Business and Finance, p. 34
 Political Ferment Hurts Guinea, The New York Times, January 31, 1972, Monday Section: Survey of Africa's Economy, p. 46
 Guinean, in Total Reversal, Asks More U.S. Investment by Bernard Weinraub, The New York Times, July 2, 1982, Friday Late City Final Edition, p. A3, Col. 5
 Guinea is Slowly Breaking Out of Its Tight Cocoon by Alan Cowell, The New York Times, December 3, 1982, Friday, Late City Final Edition, p. A2, Col. 3
 In Revolutionary Guinea, Some of the Fire is Gone by Alan Cowell, The New York Times, December 9, 1982, Thursday, Late City Final Edition, p. A2, Col. 3
 Guinea's President, Sekou Toure, Dies in Cleveland Clinic by Clifford D. May, The New York Times, Obituary, March 28, 1984, Wednesday, Late City Final Edition, p. A1, Col. 1
 Thousands Mourn Death of Toure by Clifford D. May, The New York Times, March 29, 1984, Thursday, Late City Final Edition, p. A3, Col. 1
 Ahmed Sekou Toure, a Radical Hero by Eric Pace, The New York Times, Obituary, March 28, 1984, Wednesday, Late City Final Edition, p. A6, Col. 1
 In Post-Coup Guinea, a Jail is Thrown Open. Clifford D. May. The New York Times, April 12, 1984, Thursday, Late City Final Edition, p.A1, Col. 4
 Topics; How to Run Things, Or Ruin Them, The New York Times, March 29, 1984.
 Guinea Airport Opens; Capital Appears Calm, The New York Times, April 7, 1984.
 Guinea Frees Toure's Widow, (Reuters), The New York Times, January 3, 1988.
 How France Shaped New Africa, Howard W. French, The New York Times, February 28, 1995.
 Conversations/Kwame Ture; Formerly Stokely Carmichael And Still Ready for the Revolution, Karen DeWitt, The New York Times, April 14, 1996.
 Stokely Carmichael, Rights Leader Who Coined 'Black Power,' Dies at 57, Michael T. Kaufman, The New York Times, November 16, 1998.
 'Mass graves' found in Guinea. BBC, 22 October 2002.
 Stokely Speaks (Book Review), Robert Weisbrot, The New York Times Review of Books, November 23, 2003.

 Other secondary sources

 Graeme Counsel. "Popular music and politics in Sékou Touré's Guinea". Australasian Review of African Studies. 26 (1), pp. 26–42. 2004
 Jean-Paul Alata. Prison d'Afrique
 Jean-Paul Alata. Interview-témoignage de Jean-Paul Alata sur Radio-France Internationale 
 Herve Hamon, Patrick Rotman L'affaire Alata
 Ladipo Adamolekun. "Sekou Toure's Guinea: An Experiment in Nation Building". Methuen (August 1976). 
 Koumandian Kéita. Guinée 61: L'École et la Dictature. Nubia (1984).
 Ibrahima Baba Kaké. Sékou Touré, le héros et le tyran. Jeune Afrique, Paris (1987)
 Alpha Abdoulaye Diallo. La vérité du ministre: Dix ans dans les geôles de Sékou Touré. (Questions d'actualité), Calmann-Lévy, Paris (1985). 
 Kaba Camara 41. Dans la Guinée de Sékou Touré : cela a bien eu lieu.
 Kindo Touré. Unique survivant du Complot Kaman-Fodéba
 Adolf Marx. Maudits soient ceux qui nous oublient.
 Ousmane Ardo Bâ. Camp Boiro. Sinistre geôle de Sékou Touré. Harmattan, Paris (1986) 
 Mahmoud Bah. Construire la Guinée après Sékou Touré
 Mgr. Raymond-Marie Tchidimbo. Noviciat d'un évêque : huit ans et huit mois de captivité sous Sékou Touré.
 Amadou Diallo. La mort de Telli Diallo
 Almamy Fodé Sylla. L'Itinéraire sanglant
 Comité Telli Diallo. J'ai vu : on tue des innocents en Guinée-Conakry 
 Alsény René Gomez. Parler ou périr
 Sako Kondé. Guinée. Le temps des fripouilles
 André Lewin. Diallo Telli. Le Destin tragique d'un grand Africain. 
 Camara Laye. Dramouss 
 Dr. Thierno Bah. Mon combat pour la Guinée
 Nadine Bari. Grain de sable
 Nadine Bari. Noces d'absence
 Nadine Bari. Chroniques de Guinée (1994)
 Nadine Bari. Guinée. Les cailloux de la mémoire (2004)
 Maurice Jeanjean. Nadine Bari. Sékou Touré, Un totalitarisme africain
 Collectif Jeune Afrique. Sékou Touré. Ce qu'il fut. Ce qu'il a fait. Ce qu'il faut défaire.
 Claude Abou Diakité. La Guinée enchaînée
 Alpha Condé. Guinée, néo-colonie américaine ou Albanie d'Afrique
 Lansiné Kaba. From colonialism to autocracy. Guinea under Sékou Touré: 1957–1984
 Charles E. Sory. Sékou Touré, l'ange exterminateur
 Charles Diané. Sékou Touré, l'homme et son régime : lettre ouverte au président Mitterrand
 Emile Tompapa. Sékou Touré : quarante ans de dictature
 Alpha Ousmane Barry. Pouvoir du discours et discours du pouvoir : l'art oratoire chez Sékou Touré de 1958 à 1984

External links

 1959 Time magazine cover story about Sékou Touré
 WebGuinee – Sekou Toure  Publishes full text of books and articles as well photos of Sekou Toure
 Camp Boiro Memorial. Extensive list of reports and articles on the notorious political prison where thousands of victims of the dictatorship of Sekou Toure disappeared between 1960 and 1984.
 More information about Ahmed Sékou Touré (French)
 BBC Radio: President Sekou Toure Defends One-Party Rule (1959).
 Conflict history: Guinea, 11 May 2007. International Crisis Group.
 1st page on the French National Assembly website
 2nd page on the French National Assembly website

1922 births
1984 deaths
Burials in Guinea
Collars of the Order of the White Lion
Democratic Party of Guinea – African Democratic Rally politicians
Deputies of the 3rd National Assembly of the French Fourth Republic
Grand Crosses Special Class of the Order of Merit of the Federal Republic of Germany
Guinean Muslims
Guinean pan-Africanists
Lenin Peace Prize recipients
Mandinka
Muslim socialists
People of French West Africa
People from Faranah
Presidents of Guinea
Rassemblement Démocratique Africain politicians
Recipients of the Order of the Companions of O. R. Tambo